"Maldita Foto" is a song by Argentine singer Tini and Colombian singer Manuel Turizo. It was written by Tini and Turizo, alongside songwriters Julián Turizo, Juan Diego Medina and its producers Mauricio Rengifo and Andrés Torres. This is the first collaboration between Tini and Turizo on a Latin pop song, that features sounds of reggaeton and some sounds of electric guitar for a few seconds at the beginning and the end.  Lyrically, the song talks about a breakup in a relationship, a two exes who are noticed each other in a photo taken at the right moment, and then on its a trip down memory lane reminiscing on their time together. The song, along with its music video was released on August 19, 2021, through Sony Music Latin and Hollywood Records as the second single from her fourth studio album, Cupido (2023).

Background 

"Maldita Foto" was written by Tini and Turizo, together with the songwriters Mauricio Rengifo, Andrés Torres, Juan Diego Medina and Julián Turizo, while the song's production was handled by Rengifo and Torres. Tini has been talking about the song since May, 2021, where she pointed out that it is a song with a beautiful melody, and that she is very satisfied with the new collaboration. Later was revealed that the artist she collaborate with is Manuel Turizo.

With images that Tini and Turizo shared on their respective social networks, both artists released previews of this collaboration days before the song was released. On August 16, 2021, they released the verse of the song and revealed how the song will come out on August 19, 2021. Material that dialogues with a music video in which they appear very united. Speaking about the song concept, in an interview with the media "You online", Tini and Turizo said: "Maldita Foto" sings about the breakdown of a relationship. They are going to feel very identified with the letter, and the music makes you dance and smile, despite the fact that at the same time it is, telling a not-so-good story. It's like processing pain through beautiful music.

Composition 
"Maldita Foto" is primary latin pop song with some elements of reggaeton, which Tini and Turizo often perform in their latest songs. Also this style represents Latin American music. In addition to the elements of regguaeton, an electric guitar is also present for a few seconds at the beginning and end of the song.

Turizo added during an interview for magazine "Hola". "I wake up thinking about music, it's part of my conversations, my hobbies. In my free time, I like to study the business of music, to see and know what's going on, who is coming out, what is the new sound everyone wants to hear."

Music video 
Filming for the song's music video took place in Miami, on 18–19 May 2021. A teaser video was posted on both artists social networks on August 17, 2021. The official music video was released on August 19, 2021, on Tini's official YouTube channel. The music video had half a million views in the first minutes of its release.

Tini and Turizo play ex-lovers in music video. The music video begins as Tini and her boyfriend enter a restaurant on a date. Tini pulls out her cell phone and her boyfriend takes a picture of her. Across, at the other table is Turizo with his girlfriend. Turizo's girlfriend also takes a picture of him. Two exes who, in true serendipitous fashion, spot each other in a photo taken at the right moment and the right place. From then on, it's a trip down memory lane reminiscing on their time together.

Credits and personnel 
Credits adapted from Tidal.

 Tini – vocals, songwriter
 Manuel Turizo – vocals, songwriter
 Juan Diego Medina Vélez – songwriter
 Laura Mercedez  – recording engineer
 Tom Norris – mixing engineer, mastering engineer
 Mauricio Rengifo – producer, songwriter, recording engineer, programing
 Andrés Torres – producer, songwriter, recording engineer, programing
 Julián Turizo Zapata – songwriter
 Sebastián Chicchón - graphic designer

Accolades

Release history

Charts

Weekly charts

Year-end charts

Certifications

See also
 List of airplay number-one hits of the 2010s (Argentina)

References

External links

2021 songs
2021 singles
Hollywood Records singles
Latin pop songs
Male–female vocal duets
Manuel Turizo songs
Number-one singles in Argentina
Songs written by Andrés Torres (producer)
Song recordings produced by Andrés Torres (producer)
Songs written by Mauricio Rengifo
Sony Music Latin singles
Sony Music singles
Spanish-language songs
Tini (singer) songs